Seremaia "Jerry" Burotu (born 19 July 1987) in Tavua is a Fijian rugby union footballer. He currently plays for French team Provence Rugby and the Fiji national rugby union team and usually plays as a Number 8, Inside centre or wing.

Career 
Burotu who is from Korovou Village in Tavua, started his career playing for Tavua in the Digicel Cup in 2006. He was selected by the then Fiji 7's coach, Jo Savou to join the Fiji sevens team for the last leg of the 2007–08 IRB Sevens World Series. He made his debut at the 2008 London Sevens His impact on the big stage was massive. He scored 4 tries in that tournament. He finished the 2010–11 IRB Sevens World Series with 29 tries.

He joined Top 14 side, Biarritz in April 2011. His ability to score tries with blistering speed and power attracted scouts from the Biarritz following the withdrawal of some of its key players including centres Yann Fior and Arnaud Mignardi who have signed for Brive for two seasons. He played for them in the 2012–13 European Challenge Cup as well as the 2013–14 European Challenge Cup pool stage.

In May 2016, he signed for Brive in the Top 14 competition.

References

External links

Fiji rugby profile

1987 births
Living people
Fijian rugby union players
Fijian expatriate rugby union players
Expatriate rugby union players in France
Fijian expatriate sportspeople in France
Rugby union wings
Rugby union centres
Rugby union number eights
People from Tavua, Fiji
I-Taukei Fijian people
Provence Rugby players